Michael McCue (born March 19, 1993) is a Canadian professional squash player. As of June 2018, he was ranked number 93 in the world. He won his first world tour title at the 2018 Mount Royal University Open PSA5 tournament.

References

1993 births
Living people
Canadian male squash players
Sportspeople from Greater Sudbury
21st-century Canadian people